Héctor Alejandro Suazo Inarejo (born 17 April 1978) is an Argentine-born Chilean former footballer who played as a forward.

Club career
In 2000, he was part of Universidad de Chile's team who helped the club to win its 11th title. One of his first goals in the club was in a derby against Colo-Colo for a friendly match.

On 26 July 2006, he suffered a serious injury playing for Universidad de Chile.

In 2009, Suazo joined to Lota Schwager. During his spell in these club, he is remembered for a chip goal to Provincial Osorno in a 3–2 away victory at Rubén Marcos Peralta Municipal Stadium. Then, he moved to Curicó Unido.

In 2010, he played for Mexican second-tier club Reboceros De La Piedad.

Personal life
He was born in Avellaneda, Buenos Aires, Argentina, and naturalized Chilean.

He is better known by his nickname Galleta (Cookie).

After football
He participated in 2019–20 Chilean protests.

On 15 June 2020, it was reported that he tested positive for COVID-19.

Honours

Club
Universidad de Chile
 Primera División de Chile (2): 2000, 2004 Apertura
 Copa Chile (1): 2000

References

External links
 
 
 Héctor Suazo at PlaymakerStats

1978 births
Living people
Sportspeople from Avellaneda
Argentine emigrants to Chile
Naturalized citizens of Chile
Chilean footballers
Chilean expatriate footballers
Trasandino footballers
Universidad de Chile footballers
Deportes Temuco footballers
Deportes La Serena footballers
Everton de Viña del Mar footballers
Club Deportivo Palestino footballers
Unión Española footballers
C.D. Antofagasta footballers
San Luis de Quillota footballers
Lota Schwager footballers
Deportes Concepción (Chile) footballers
La Piedad footballers
Curicó Unido footballers
Deportivo Zacapa players
Tercera División de Chile players
Chilean Primera División players
Primera B de Chile players
Ascenso MX players
Liga Nacional de Fútbol de Guatemala players
Chilean expatriate sportspeople in Mexico
Chilean expatriate sportspeople in Guatemala
Expatriate footballers in Mexico
Expatriate footballers in Guatemala
Association football forwards